Lincoln Park Airport  is a privately owned, public use airport located two nautical miles (4 km) north of the central business district of Lincoln Park, in Morris County, New Jersey, United States. It is included in the National Plan of Integrated Airport Systems for 2019–2023, which categorized it as a general aviation reliever airport.

Facilities and aircraft 
Lincoln Park Airport covers an area of 168 acres (68 ha) at an elevation of 182 feet (55 m) above mean sea level. It has one runway designated 1/19 with an asphalt surface measuring 2,942 by 40 feet (897 x 12 m).

For the 12-month period ending March 31, 2018, the airport had 30,150 general aviation aircraft operations, an average of 83 per day. At that time there were 94 aircraft based at this airport: 88% single-engine, 6% helicopter, and 5% multi-engine.

Places 
 The Sunset Pub & Grill is right next to the airport. There is a good view of the airport's runway from the restaurant.
 Aero Safety Training, an airplane (fixed wing) flight school located at the airport
 Jetlink Aviation, an airplane (fixed wing) multi-engine flight school located at the airport

See also 
 List of airports in New Jersey

References

External links 
 Lincoln Park Airport, official website
 
 Lincoln Park Airport (N07) from New Jersey DOT Airport Directory
 Aerial image as of April 1995 from USGS The National Map
 

Airports in New Jersey
Transportation buildings and structures in Morris County, New Jersey